Yan Aung Myin Shwe Lett Hla Pagoda is a historical stupa located in Yan Aung Myin Village in Lewe Township, Naypyidaw, in Myanmar.

History
According to historical records, it was said that King Ashoka, in his reign on BC 268 to 232, had been sent his counselors to the whole region to establish numerous stupas to be honour the eighty-four thousand relics of the Buddha. Shwe Let Hla stupa was one of the stupas which had been erected in Yan Aung Myin village; former called Naung-Pyin village by the counselors of King Ashoka.

It was also considered that, on AD 87, the King Thamoddarit (called later Bagan King) had arrived at the stupa hill and maintained Naung-Pyin Stupa. While he was injured in a war and offered the stupa to be in good order of his wound in addition to successfully attack his enemy. He renamed Naung Pyin Stupa to Yan Aung Myin Stupa as well as Naung Pyin village to Yan Aung Myin village, after recovering of his wound arm and success in the war. It was because the injury of his arm had been in well condition of  what he named Lett -Hla Pagoda, (lit. Beautiful hand) and later called "Shwe Lett Hla Pagoda".

Maintenance
The stupa had been updated under Bagan period  of King Alaungsithu and King Narapatisithu. The commander was again under the hand. It was said that in the time of King Mingyi Nyo of Taungoo, he often visited and updated the stupa and donated lands in the time of excavation to the Sin-Own Lake which is located in the southern tip of the Naypyidaw now. The stupa which had been collapsed in the 1838 earthquake on the days of King Tharrawaddy was maintained by head of Lan-Pyinmana village named Nay-Myo-Kyaw-Thu U Ar-Toke.

Donors
The pagoda was offered its Htidaw (Crown Umbrella) in 1868 by the brother of Mohnyin governor in King Mindon's reign and donated new one by "Bodhigon Sayadaw" on 1875.

Photos

References

Pagodas in Myanmar
Naypyidaw